Irene Cortes (born 1979) is a filmmaker and artist.

Biography 
Irene was born in 1979.

She has been exhibiting artist and filmmaker for more than 18 years active filmmaker and has been making films for more than 18 years. Most of her work is related to tackling climate change and she calls her style of filmmaking "building film". Her films have been exhibited in Dieselverkstaden, Sweden; Platoon Kunsthalle, Berlin; RufXXX, Seoul; Spin Gallery, Toronto.

As an author, her books have been published in Asian countries.

Work 
 Nowhere Here Now
 The Gata: Water Ceremony

Awards and recognition 
 For The Luminous Landscape (2019)

References 

Living people
1979 births
Filipino film directors
Filipino women film directors